Romell Samir Quioto Robinson (born 9 August 1991), nicknamed El Romántico (The Romantic), is a Honduran professional footballer who plays as a forward for Major League Soccer club CF Montréal and captains the Honduras national team.

Club career

C.D.S. Vida 
Quioto came up through the youth ranks of Unión Ájax before being sold to Liga Nacional side C.D.S. VIda.  Quioto made his debut for Vida in the Liga Nacional during the 2010 Clausura season and scored his first goal 6 March 2010 in a 4–1 victory over Real Juventud. For the 2012–13 season, he was loaned out to Polish Ekstraklasa side Wisła Kraków. He had 2 assists in his debut, a 5–0 win against Luboński 1943 in the Polish Cup Quioto stepped on a players leg on 31 August 2012 and received a five-game suspension. By the time he returned, Quioto had lost his place in the team and could only make a few substitute appearances. The loan was terminated in January 2013. Quioto returned to Vida for the 2013 Clausura and he finished joint top scorer for the 2013 Apertura

C.D. Olimpia 
On 30 November 2013, Quioto signed with C.D. Olimpia. He made his debut for Olimpia on 12 January 2014 in a 1–1 draw against C.D. Real Sociedad.  He scored his first goal for Olimpia on 26 January in their Clásico Moderno match against rival club Real España. He made his first appearance in the CONCACAF Champions League  on 5 August 2014 against Alpha United. On 9 May 2015, Quioto played in the 2015 Honduran Cup, scoring a goal in the 3–1 win over Platense. Quioto was part of the Olimpia squad that won the 2014 Clausura, the 2015 Clausura, and the 2016 Clausura, as well as the 2015 Honduran Cup and the 2016 Honduran Supercup Clausura.

Houston Dynamo 
On 23 December 2016,  Romell Quioto was sold to Major League Soccer team Houston Dynamo. He scored on his Dynamo debut on 4 March 2017 in a 3–1 win over the Seattle Sounders. The goal was named MLS Goal of the Week and he was named to the Team of the Week. He would score in his first 3 games for Houston. He scored in his next two games as well.  After a quiet April, Quioto registered his fourth goal and his first assist for Houston on 6 May in a 4–0 win over Orlando City.  Quioto helped the Dynamo qualify for the MLS Playoffs for the first time since 2013. The Dynamo reached the Western Conference Finals before falling to the Sounders.

in 2018, Quioto got off to a slow start, with no goals or assists in the first five matches. However, in the 6th game of the season,  he scored once and assisted twice in a 5–1 win over Toronto. This was the start of a period of great form for Quioto, scoring three with six assists in a seven-game stretch.  He was twice named to the MLS Team of the Week during this stretch. On September 29, Quioto scored in the 87th minute to give Houston a 3–2 win over the San Jose Earthquakes. In the final match of the regular season Quioto scored one to help the Dynamo overcome a 2–0 deficit to defeat the LA Galaxy 3–2.  Quioto was named to the Team of the Week as a result.   Although the Dynamo missed out on the MLS playoffs for 2018, they won the 2018 US Open Cup, the first in club history. He scored 2 goals in the Dynamo's 4–2 win over Sporting Kansas City on 18 July. In the final, Quioto hit a shot that resulted in an own-goal, helping the Dynamo defeat the Philadelphia Union 3–0.  The Open Cup win qualified them for the 2019 CONCACAF Champions League. Quioto finished the year with 8 goals and 12 assists in 36 games across all competitions.

Quioto made his first appearance of the 2019 season in Houston's opening game, a 1–0 win over C.D. Guastatoya in the Champions League on 19 February. He picked up his first assist of the year on 9 March, sending in a cross that Mauro Manotas directed into the net in the 86th minute to give the Dynamo a 2–1 win over the Montreal Impact.  Quioto scored his first goal of the season 6 July in a 3–2 defeat at FC Cincinnati.  He would find the back of the net again in the Dynamo's next match, however they would lose again, this time to LAFC. On 8 August, Quioto was sent off for elbowing NYCFC defender Rónald Matarrita in the back of the head.  The Dynamo would go on to lose 3–2. After the game, Dynamo head coach Wilmer Cabrera announced that he had apologized to the referees and the NYCFC coaches and players for Quioto's actions, stating "I will not tolerate it more on the team because we come to play football. I apologize to the fans, the Houston Dynamo team and the entire league because what happened today."  Quioto apologized for his actions on social media after the game. On 16 August, the MLS announced that Quioto had been suspended an additional game, besides the automatic suspension for a red card, and fined an undisclosed amount for violent conduct as well as fined him for failing to leave the field quickly after receiving the red card. Even after the suspension, Quioto did not return to the Dynamo first team. He was not allowed in the locker room and trained separately from the rest of the team. On 7 October 2019, Quioto revealed through his social media accounts that he would no longer continue with the Dynamo. He had not played for two months.

CF Montréal 
On 20 November 2019, Quioto was traded to the Montreal Impact, later renamed CF Montréal, in exchange for Víctor Cabrera and $100,000 in allocation money.  In his debut, on 19 February 2020 against Deportivo Saprissa in the first leg of the CONCACAF Champions League Round of 16 tie, he scored once in a 2–2 draw.  He started the return leg, a 0–0 draw that saw Montreal advance on away goals. He made his MLS debut for the Impact on 29 February, scoring once in a 2–1 over the New England Revolution. In early March, before matchweek 3, the MLS season was suspended due to the COVID-19 Pandemic.  Play resumed in July with the MLS is Back Tournament, with group stage games counting for the regular season. Quioto scored once in four appearances as Montreal reached the round of 16 at the tournament. On 25 August, in the Impact's first game since the MLS is Back Tournament ended, Quioto scored once as Montreal beat the Vancouver Whitecaps 2–0.  He scored in consecutive matches on 13 September and 16 September, both against Vancouver.  On 20 September he scored against the Philadelphia Union to make it a goal in three straight games.  However, he did not finish the match as he was shown a red card in the 16th minute after elbowing Mark McKenzie of the Union in the head.  In addition to the automatic one-game suspension for a red card, the MLS suspended him an additional match and fined him an undisclosed amount.  On 8 November, in the final match of the regular season, Quioto set up Victor Wanyama in the 74th minute and scored in the 88th to give Montreal a 3–2 win over D.C. United, which enabled Montreal to qualify for the playoffs.  On 20 November, in the Impact's opening match of the playoffs, Quioto scored once as Montreal lost 2–1 to the New England Revolution.  On 30 November, Quioto signed a contract extension with Montreal until 2022 with a team option for 2023. Having amassed 8 goals and 6 assists in 19 appearances, he was named the Montreal Impact MVP.

International career
He earned his first cap for Honduras on 29 February 2012 in a friendly match against Ecuador. Quioto represented Honduras at the 2016 Summer Olympics and made 6 appearances and scored 1 goal, helping Honduras finish 4th. He scored his first senior team goal on 10 February 2016, a 1–3 loss to Guatemala in a friendly. On 10 October 2017, Quioto scored the winning goal against Mexico in the last match of 2018 World Cup Qualifiers which sent the Hondurans to the Inter-Continental Playoff where they lost to Australia.

Career statistics

Club

International

International goals
Scores and results list Honduras' goal tally first.

Honours
Olimpia
Liga Nacional: 2014 Clausura, 2015 Clausura, 2016 Clausura
Honduran Cup: 2015
Supercopa de Honduras: 2016 Clausura

Houston Dynamo
U.S. Open Cup: 2018

CF Montréal
Canadian Championship: 2021

Individual
Montreal Impact MVP: 2020

Personal life 
On 22 June 2018, Quioto received his US Green Card, qualifying him as a domestic player for MLS roster purposes.

References

External links

1991 births
Living people
People from Colón Department (Honduras)
Association football wingers
Honduran footballers
Honduras international footballers
C.D.S. Vida players
Wisła Kraków players
Houston Dynamo FC players
CF Montréal players
Honduran expatriate footballers
Expatriate footballers in Poland
Expatriate soccer players in the United States
Expatriate soccer players in Canada
Honduran expatriate sportspeople in Poland
Honduran expatriate sportspeople in the United States
Honduran expatriate sportspeople in Canada
Olympic footballers of Honduras
Major League Soccer players
2014 Copa Centroamericana players
2015 CONCACAF Gold Cup players
Footballers at the 2016 Summer Olympics
2017 CONCACAF Gold Cup players
2019 CONCACAF Gold Cup players
2021 CONCACAF Gold Cup players